The Urar mouse-like hamster or Azerbaijani mouse-like hamster (Calomyscus urartensis) is a medium-sized mouse-like hamster from Nakhichevan, Azerbaijan and northwestern Azarbaijan Province, Iran.  It is among the better studied representatives of this poorly known genus.  The initial species description was based on a unique chromosome number (2n=32; FNa=42) called a karyotype.  The species status has been confirmed with other chromosomal studies and morphometric studies.  The species description by Vorontsov et al. and subsequent prompted elevation of several subspecies of Calomyscus bailwardi to species status.

References

Mouse-like hamsters
Mammals of Western Asia
Mammals of Azerbaijan
Fauna of Azerbaijan
Fauna of Iran
Mammals described in 1979